Equestrian competitions at the 2003 Pan American Games in Santo Domingo, Dominican Republic, were held in 2003 at the Palmarejo Equestrian Center (dressage and jumping). The venue seated 600 people and was 65 km from the athlete's village. Eventing competition were held separately as a Pan American Eventing Championship in Fair Hill, United States and were officially not included in the results.

Medal summary

Medal table

Events

Events in Fair Hill

See also
 Equestrian at the 2004 Summer Olympics

References

Events at the 2003 Pan American Games
2003
P
Equestrian sports competitions in the Dominican Republic